Kudelstaart is a town in the Dutch province of North Holland. It is a part of the municipality of Aalsmeer, and lies about 10 km southeast of Hoofddorp.

The village was first mentioned in 1237 as Sconedorpe. The current name is a combination of "fish net" and "long, thin piece of land". Kudelstaart developed around 1200 as a peat excavation settlement. In the 13th century, it was split between Holland and Utrecht. In 1724, the heerlijkheid was bought by the city of Amsterdam.

Geography
Kudelstaart lies on the Westeinderplassen, a large complex of lakes.

Economy
Like in neighbouring Aalsmeer, greenhouse-based agriculture is very important to the local economy.

Architecture
Perhaps the most remarkable edifice in Kudelstaart is the fort belonging to the Stelling van Amsterdam. Construction started in 1890. In 1906, a large bombproof main building was constructed. Since 1959, it is in use as a marina.

Public transport
 357 - Kudelstaart - Aalsmeer - Amstelveen - Amsterdam City Centre - Amsterdam Centraal

This services is very frequent, quarter-hourly through the day and half-hourly in the evenings.

Gallery

References

Populated places in North Holland
Aalsmeer